Kilkenny City was an Irish borough constituency in the House of Commons of the United Kingdom of Great Britain and Ireland, returning one Member of Parliament (MP). It was an original constituency represented in Parliament when the Union of Great Britain and Ireland took effect on 1 January 1801, and remained in existence until its abolition at the 1918 general election.

Boundaries 
This constituency was the parliamentary borough of Kilkenny in County Kilkenny.

Members of Parliament

Elections

Elections in the 1830s

Sullivan resigned, causing a by-election.

Elections in the 1840s

Elections in the 1850s

Elections in the 1860s

Elections in the 1870s 

Gray's death caused a by-election.

Elections in the 1880s 
Whitworth's resignation caused a by-election.

Elections in the 1890s

Elections in the 1900s

Elections in the 1910s

References 

 The Parliaments of England by Henry Stooks Smith (1st edition published in three volumes 1844–50), 2nd edition edited (in one volume) by F.W.S. Craig (Political Reference Publications 1973)
 
 

Westminster constituencies in County Kilkenny (historic)
Constituencies of the Parliament of the United Kingdom established in 1801
Constituencies of the Parliament of the United Kingdom disestablished in 1918
Kilkenny (city)